Peter de Souza (date of birth not known) is an Indian-born Ugandan former first-class cricketer.

de Souza was born at Karachi in British India, where he learnt his cricket, before emigrating to the Uganda Protectorate from Pakistan circa 1958. He played his club cricket amongst other Indian-descended diaspora, playing for Jai Sports Club. He made a single appearance in first-class cricket for an East African Invitation XI against the touring Marylebone Cricket Club at Kampala in November 1963. Batting twice in the match from the lower order, he was dismissed for 16 runs by Jeff Jones, while in their second innings he was promoted to the middle order and scored 15 unbeaten runs. He played minor matches for Uganda from 1959 to 1964.

References

External links

Date of birth unknown
Possibly living people
Cricketers from Karachi
Ugandan people of Indian descent
Ugandan people of Goan descent
Indian emigrants to Uganda
Ugandan cricketers
East African cricketers